The 2022–23 Euro Hockey Tour is the 27th season of Euro Hockey Tour. It started in November 2022 and will last until May 2023. It consists of Karjala Tournament, SWISS Ice Hockey Games, Beijer Hockey Games and Carlson Hockey Games.

Standings

Karjala Tournament

The Karjala Tournament was played between 10–13 November 2022. Five matches were played in Turku, Finland and one match in České Budějovice, Czech Republic. Tournament was won by Sweden.

SWISS Ice Hockey Games 

The 2022 SWISS Ice Hockey Games was played between 15–18 December 2022. Five matches was played in Fribourg, Switzerland and one match in Helsinki, Finland. Tournament was won by Sweden.

Beijer Hockey Games

The 2023 Beijer Hockey Games was played between 9–12 February 2023.  Five matches were played in Malmö, Sweden and one match in Zurich, Switzerland. Tournament was won by Sweden.

Carlson Hockey Games

The 2023 Carlson Hockey Games will be played between 4–7 May 2023. Five matches will be played in Czech Republic and one match in Gothenburg, Sweden.

External links
 European Hockey Tour on Eurohockey.com

References 

Euro Hockey Tour
2022–23 in European ice hockey